The Apparition Phase is a ghost story novel by Will Maclean that was published in hardback on October 29, 2020 and paperback on October 14, 2021.

Background 
The author included a piecemeal short story scattered throughout one thousand signed copies of the book.

Plot
In the early 1970s, Tim and Abi, a pair of precocious twins obsessed with macabre subjects, fake a ghost photograph in order to scare a schoolmate, Janice Tupp. The prank succeeds beyond their expectations, and Janice faints in class at school, cutting her head. Terrified that they'll get into trouble, Tim and Abi invite Janice to their home and show her how the picture was faked. Janice, however, insists they have, in fact, taken a real photo of a ghost, "Or will have done, soon." The second half of the book follows the adolescent Tim, a few years later, as he joins a group of other teenagers in a psychic experiment at an old house in Suffolk.

Reception
The Guardian called it "the perfect novel for our phantom present."

Awards
The novel was shortlisted for the 2021 McKitterick Prize. It won the Dracula Society's Children of the Night Award.

References 

2020 British novels
Ghost novels
Heinemann (publisher) books